Qeshlaq-e Sufilar Hajj Mirza Ali Aqa (also Romanized as Qeshlāq-e Şūfīlār Ḩājj Mīrzā ʿAlī Āqā) is a village in Qeshlaq-e Shomali Rural District, in the Central District of Parsabad County, Ardabil Province, Iran. At the 2006 census, its population was 54, in 13 families.

References 

Towns and villages in Parsabad County